Phung is a Vietnamese surname. The name is transliterated as Feng in Chinese and Pung in Korean. The word Phung without the accent is also a Chinese surname Péng (彭), usually found in Southeast Asia. 
Phung is the anglicized variation of the surname Phùng.

Notable people with the surname Phùng
Phùng Hưng
Phung Khac Khoan
Phùng Quang Thanh, an officer of the Vietnam People's Army
Phung Thi Chinh

Vietnamese-language surnames

vi:Phùng (họ)